"Terrifying" is a song by the English rock band the Rolling Stones from their 1989 album Steel Wheels.

Details
It was written by Mick Jagger and Keith Richards. The song was also released as a single in 1990 and the B-side was "Wish I'd Never Met You", a non-album track that later was included on the group's 2005 compilation album Rarities 1971–2003.

"Terrifying" peaked at number eight on [[Billboard (magazine)|Billboard]]''s Mainstream Rock Songs chart.

It is a mid-tempo song, performed at 143 beats per minute.

Personnel
The Rolling Stones
Mick Jagger – lead and backing vocals, shakers
Keith Richards – guitar, backing vocals
Ronnie Wood – guitar
Bill Wyman – bass guitar
Charlie Watts – drums

Additional musicians
Chuck Leavell – organ
Matt Clifford – keyboards
Lisa Fischer – backing vocals
Roddy Lorimer – trumpet
Nick Mason – rototoms

References

1989 songs
1990 singles
The Rolling Stones songs
Songs written by Jagger–Richards